Pascale Petit may refer to:

 Pascale Petit (actress) (b. 1938), French actress
 Pascale Petit (poet) (b. 1953), French poet